This was the first edition of the tournament.

Nuno Borges and Francisco Cabral won the title after defeating Jeevan Nedunchezhiyan and Purav Raja 6–3, 6–4 in the final.

Seeds

Draw

References

External links
 Main draw

Tenerife Challenger - Doubles
Tenerife Challenger